Gardenia vilhelmii is a species of plant in the family Rubiaceae native to northeastern Australia.

References

vilhelmii
Endemic flora of Queensland
Taxa named by Karel Domin